The first USS Defiance (ID-3327) was a cargo ship in the United States Navy during World War I.

Defiance was built in 1918 by Union Iron Works of Bethlehem Shipbuilding Company, Alameda, California. She was acquired by the Navy 5 September 1918; and commissioned the same day.

Defiance sailed from San Francisco 14 September 1918 with a cargo of flour and naval stores, and arrived at New York 11 October to exchange her cargo for Army supplies. Ten days later she was underway for Norfolk, Virginia to join a convoy bound for Southampton, England, and Dunkirk, France, where she delivered her cargo to the Army of Occupation. She returned to Immingham and Dublin, Ireland, to load material being returned to the States. She departed 27 January 1919 for Hampton Roads, and arrived 16 February.

Defiance was decommissioned 1 March 1919 and delivered to the Shipping Board the same day for disposal.

References
 
 http://www.navsource.org/archives/12/173327.htm

 

1918 ships
Cargo ships of the United States Navy
Ships built in San Francisco
World War I cargo ships of the United States
Standard World War I ships
Steamships of the United States